Archer/Park was an American country music duo composed of singer-songwriters Randy Archer and Johnny Park. Signed to Atlantic Records in 1994, the duo released its sole album, We Got a Lot in Common, that year. Two of the album's singles entered the Billboard Hot Country Singles & Tracks charts: "Where There's Smoke" at No. 29 and the title track at No. 63.

Biography
Archer/Park consisted of songwriters and vocalists Randy Archer (born February 20, 1959 in Swainsboro, Georgia) and Johnny Park (born October 30, 1957 in Arlington, Texas). The two had success writing songs for other country music artists, and began working together in the same publishing company. As a result, they decided to form a duo and signed with Atlantic Records' Nashville branch in 1994. They recorded their debut album We Got a Lot in Common that same year. The album's two singles "Where There's Smoke" and "We Got a Lot in Common" both charted on Billboard Hot Country Songs. The album received a mixed review from John P. McLaughlin of the Alberta Province, who thought the album was "generic" and derivative of Brooks & Dunn. An uncredited review in Gavin Report described the title track favorably, saying that the duo showed a sense of humor on it.

After their only album, Archer resumed working as a songwriter, with Tim McGraw and John Michael Montgomery being among the acts who recorded his songs. He and Park also wrote songs for Montgomery and for Elbert West. In 2006, Archer released a solo album entitled Shots in the Dark on an independent label.

In 2009, Park and his son, Clint, formed the duo The Parks, which signed to Lyric Street Records subsidiary Carolwood Records.

We Got a Lot in Common

Track listing
"We Got a Lot in Common" (Randy Archer, Johnny Park, Bobby P. Barker) – 3:07
"Where There's Smoke" (Barker, Mark Collie) – 2:54
"You Don't Know Where This Heart's Been" (Archer, Park, Barker) – 3:59
"I'm Not Crazy" (Archer, Park, Barker) – 2:55
"Your Ol' Rock" (Archer, Park, Barker, Doug Nichols) – 3:33
"The Man That I Am" (Walt Aldridge, Darryl Worley) – 2:56
"Don't Look Now" (Archer, Park, Nichols) – 2:48
"'Til Something Better Comes Along" (Charles Quillen) – 3:29
"Permanent Thing" (Jerry Abbott, Charles Stewart) – 3:19
"I Still Wanna Jump Your Bones" (Archer, Park, Barker) – 3:04

Personnel
Eddie Bayers – drums
Mark Casstevens – acoustic guitar
Paul Franklin – pedal steel guitar, slide guitar, Pedabro
Steve Gibson – electric guitar
Tim "Felipe" Gonzalez – harmonica
Rob Hajacos – fiddle
Owen Hale – drums
Brent Mason – electric guitar
Dave Pomeroy – bass guitar
Don Potter – acoustic guitar
Ron "Snake" Reynolds – percussion
Randy Scruggs – acoustic and electric guitars
Milton Sledge – drums
Bobby Wood – piano, synthesizer
Bob Wray – bass guitar

Singles

Music videos

References

Country music groups from Tennessee
Country music duos
Musical groups established in 1994
Musical groups disestablished in 1994
Atlantic Records artists
1994 establishments in Tennessee